Lieutenant General Tome H. Walters Jr. was Director, Defense Security Cooperation Agency, Office of the Secretary of Defense, Arlington, Virginia. The agency directs and oversees U.S. foreign military sales, foreign military financing programs, international military education and training programs, and humanitarian assistance and demining programs.

General Walters was born in Shreveport, Louisiana, and graduated from the United States Air Force Academy in 1970. He has served in command and staff positions at Air Force headquarters, the Joint Staff, Air Mobility Command, Air Training Command and Strategic Air Command. General Walters commanded an air refueling squadron, a pilot training operations group and an air refueling wing. He is a command pilot, having flown more than 3,500 hours in air refueling and trainer aircraft, including 100 air refueling support sorties in Southeast Asia during the Vietnam War.

Walters retired on July 1, 2004 and moved to Seguin, Texas.

Education
1965 Fair Park High School, Shreveport, Louisiana
1970 Bachelor of Science degree in international affairs, U.S. Air Force Academy, Colorado Springs, Colorado
1976 Squadron Officer School, Maxwell Air Force Base, Alabama
1981 Air Command and Staff College, Maxwell AFB, Alabama
1987 Air War College, Maxwell AFB, Alabama
1996 Seminar XXI, Foreign Political and International Relations, Massachusetts Institute of Technology
1996 Program for Senior Executives in National and International Security, Harvard University

Assignments
June 1970 - July 1971, student, Undergraduate Pilot Training, Williams AFB, Arizona
January 1972 - July 1977, pilot, aircraft commander, instructor pilot, chief of training flight, and standardization and evaluation, 11th Air Refueling Squadron, Altus AFB, Oklahoma
August 1977 - July 1980, KC-135 flight evaluator and chief, Command Instrument Flight Division, 1st Combat Evaluation Group, Barksdale AFB, Louisiana
August 1980 - June 1981, student, Air Command and Staff College, Maxwell AFB, Alabama
July 1981 - May 1984, Tanker Requirements Project Officer, Directorate of Research, Development and Acquisition, Headquarters U.S. Air Force, Washington, D.C.
May 1984 - July 1986, Commander, 407th Air Refueling Squadron, Loring AFB, Maine
August 1986 - June 1987, student, Air War College, Maxwell AFB, Alabama
July 1987 - August 1989, tanker force programmer, later, Deputy Chief of Strategic Forces, later, Chief, Programs Division, Directorate of Programs and Evaluation, Headquarters U.S. Air Force, Washington, D.C.
August 1989 - December 1991, Director of Requirements, Headquarters Air Training Command, Randolph AFB, Texas
December 1991 - February 1993, Commander, 47th Operations Group, Laughlin AFB, Texas
February 1993 - March 1994, Commander, 19th Air Refueling Wing, Robins AFB, Georgia
March 1994 - June 1995, Deputy Director of Programs and Evaluation, Headquarters U.S. Air Force, Washington, D.C.
July 1995 - September 1996, Deputy Director for Operations, National Military Command Center, J-3, the Joint Staff, Washington, D.C.
October 1996 - December 1998, Director of Global Reach Programs, Office of the Assistant Secretary of the Air Force for Acquisition, Headquarters U.S. Air Force, Washington, D.C.
December 1998 - August 2000, Principal Assistant Deputy Undersecretary of the Air Force for International Affairs, Office of the Undersecretary of the Air Force, Headquarters U.S. Air Force, Washington, D.C.
August 2000–July 1, 2004 (Retirement), Director, Defense Security Cooperation Agency, Office of the Secretary of Defense, Arlington, Va.

Flight information
Rating: Command pilot
Flight hours: More than 3,500 hours
Aircraft flown: KC-135A/R, T-37 and T-38

Major awards and decorations
  Defense Distinguished Service Medal
  Air Force Distinguished Service Medal
  Defense Superior Service Medal
  Legion of Merit with oak leaf cluster
  Distinguished Flying Cross
  Meritorious Service Medal with two oak leaf clusters
  Air Medal with two oak leaf clusters
  Air Force Commendation Medal with oak leaf cluster
  Vietnam Service Medal with bronze star
  Republic of Vietnam Gallantry Cross with Palm
Cross of Merit, Second Class (Republic of Estonia)

Other achievements
Department of State Superior Honor Award

Effective dates of promotion
Second Lieutenant June 3, 1970
First Lieutenant December 3, 1971
Captain December 3, 1973
Major July 1, 1980
Lieutenant colonel May 1, 1984
Colonel August 1, 1989
Brigadier general July 1, 1995
Major General April 1, 1998
Lieutenant general October 1, 2000

External links
Official biography

Massachusetts Institute of Technology alumni
Harvard University alumni
United States Air Force generals
People from Shreveport, Louisiana
United States Air Force Academy alumni
Recipients of the Defense Distinguished Service Medal
Recipients of the Air Force Distinguished Service Medal
Recipients of the Legion of Merit
Recipients of the Distinguished Flying Cross (United States)
Recipients of the Air Medal
Recipients of the Gallantry Cross (Vietnam)
Living people
Recipients of the Defense Superior Service Medal
Year of birth missing (living people)